St Bartholomew's Church, Sutton cum Lound is a Grade I listed parish church in the Church of England in Sutton cum Lound.

History

The church dates from the 12th century.

It is in a joint parish with twenty nearby churches.

Organ

The church has a two manual pipe organ by Brindley & Foster. A specification of the organ can be found on the National Pipe Organ Register.

References

12th-century church buildings in England
Church of England church buildings in Nottinghamshire
Grade I listed churches in Nottinghamshire